Benoît Fleurot (born 26 April 1973) is a Mauritian swimmer. He competed in four events at the 1992 Summer Olympics.

References

External links
 

1973 births
Living people
Mauritian male swimmers
Olympic swimmers of Mauritius
Swimmers at the 1992 Summer Olympics
Place of birth missing (living people)
African Games medalists in swimming
Competitors at the 1991 All-Africa Games
African Games silver medalists for Mauritius
African Games bronze medalists for Mauritius